is a Japanese pharmaceutical company.

One of its products is the antidepressant setiptiline (Tecipul).

References

Pharmaceutical companies based in Tokyo
Pharmaceutical companies established in 1945
Companies listed on the Tokyo Stock Exchange